Braids (also referred to as plaits) are a complex hairstyle formed by interlacing three or more strands of hair.  Braiding has been used to style and ornament human and animal hair for thousands of years in various cultures around the world.

The simplest and most common version is a flat, solid, three-stranded structure. More complex patterns can be constructed from an arbitrary number of strands to create a wider range of structures (such as a fishtail braid, a five-stranded braid, rope braid, a French braid and a waterfall braid). The structure is usually long and narrow with each component strand functionally equivalent in zigzagging forward through the overlapping mass of the others. Structurally, hair braiding can be compared with the process of weaving, which usually involves two separate perpendicular groups of strands (warp and weft).

History

The oldest known reproduction of hair braiding may go back about 30,000 years: the Venus of Willendorf, now known in academia as the Woman of Willendorf, is a female figurine estimated to have been made between about 28,000 and 25,000 BCE. It has been disputed whether or not she wears braided hair or some sort of a woven basket on her head.
The Venus of Brassempouy is estimated to be about 25,000 years old and ostensibly shows a braided hairstyle.

Another sample of a different origin was traced back to a burial site called Saqqara located on the Nile River, during the first dynasty of Pharaoh Menes, although the Venus’ of Brassempouy and Willendorf predate these examples by some 25,000-30,000 years.

During the Bronze Age and Iron Age many peoples in West Asia, Asia Minor, Caucasus, Southeast Europe, East Mediterranean and North Africa such as the Sumerians, Akkadians, Assyrians, Babylonians, Elamites, Hittites, Minoans, Greeks, Persians, Israelites, Canaanites  and Ancient Egyptians were depicted in art with braided or platted hair and beards. There has also been found bog bodies in Northern Europe wearing braided hairstyles from the Northern European Iron Age.

In some regions, a braid was a means of communication. At a glance, one individual could distinguish a wealth of information about another, whether they were married, mourning, or of age for courtship, simply by observing their hairstyle. Braids were a means of social stratification. Certain hairstyles were distinctive to particular tribes or nations. Other styles informed others of an individual's status in society.

African people such as the Himba people of Namibia have been braiding their hair for centuries. In many African tribes, hairstyles are unique and used to identify each tribe. Braid patterns or hairstyles can be an indication of a person's community, age, marital status, wealth, power, social position, and religion.

On July 3, 2019, California became the first US state to prohibit discrimination over natural hair. Governor Gavin Newsom signed the CROWN Act into law, banning employers and schools from discriminating against hairstyles such as dreadlocks,  braids, afros, and twists. Later in 2019, Assembly Bill 07797 became law in New York state; it "prohibits race discrimination based on natural hair or hairstyles."

Braiding is traditionally a social art. Because of the time it takes to braid hair, people have often taken time to socialize while braiding and having their hair braided. It begins with the elders making simple knots and braids for younger children. Older children watch and learn from them, start practicing on younger children, and eventually learn the traditional designs. This carries on a tradition of bonding between elders and the new generation.

There are a number of different types of braided hairstyles, including, commonly, French braids, corn rows, and box braiding. Braided hairstyles may also be used in combination with or as an alternative to simpler bindings, such as ponytails or pigtails. Braiding may also be used to add ornamentation, such as beads or hair extensions, as in crochet braiding.

Braiding is also used to prepare horses' manes and tails for showing such as in polo and polocrosse.

Braiding in particular cultures

Indian braids 

In India, braiding is common in both rural and urban areas. Girls are seen in twin braids especially in schools, though now it is becoming less common. Young girls usually have one long braid. Married women have a bun or a braided bun.

African and African American braids

Braids have been part of black culture going back generations. There are pictures going as far back as the year 1884 showing a Senegalese woman with braided hair in a similar fashion to how they are worn today.

Braids are normally done tighter in black culture than in others, such as in cornrows or box braids. While this leads to the style staying in place for longer, it can also lead to initial discomfort. This is commonly accepted and managed through pain easing techniques. Some include pain killers, letting the braids hang low, and using leave-in-conditioner. Alternative braiding techniques like knotless braids, which incorporate more of a person's natural hair and place less tension on the scalp, can cause less discomfort. 

Braids are not usually worn year-round in black culture; they are instead alternated with other popular hairstyles such as hair twists, protective hairstyles and more. Curly Mohawk, Half Updo and Side-Swept Cornrows braids are some of the popular and preferred styles in black culture. 
As long as braids are done with a person’s own hair, it can be considered as part of the natural hair movement.

See also
 List of hairstyles

References